Pongsakorn Paeyo (born 1 December 1996) is a Thai wheelchair racer in the T53 classification. Paeyo represented Thailand at the 2016 and 2020 Summer Paralympics. At the 2016 Paralympic games in Rio, he won two gold medals in the 400 metres and 800 metres event and two silver medals in the 100 metres and 4×400 relay event. In August 2021, Paeyo set the new world record at the 2020 Tokyo Paralympics in the 400 metres event and claimed his third Paralympic gold medal.

Major results

References

External links
 
 

Pongsakorn Paeyo
Pongsakorn Paeyo
Paralympic medalists in athletics (track and field)
Medalists at the 2016 Summer Paralympics
Medalists at the 2020 Summer Paralympics
Athletes (track and field) at the 2016 Summer Paralympics
Athletes (track and field) at the 2020 Summer Paralympics
Pongsakorn Paeyo
Paralympic wheelchair racers
World Para Athletics Championships winners
Pongsakorn Paeyo
Male wheelchair racers
1996 births
Living people
World record holders in Paralympic athletics
Pongsakorn Paeyo
Pongsakorn Paeyo
Medalists at the 2018 Asian Para Games